The 11th Annual Nickelodeon Kids' Choice Awards was held on April 4, 1998, at Pauley Pavilion at UCLA in Los Angeles, California. Pop band Hanson won the most awards of the night, with wins for Favorite Group & Favorite Song. The ceremony is also notable for leading into "Dog Gone", the first episode of Nickelodeon's then newest Nicktoon, CatDog.

Winners and nominees
Winners are listed first, in bold. Other nominees are in alphabetical order.

Movies

Television

Music

Sports

Miscellaneous

Hall of Fame
Tia Mowry
Tamera Mowry

References

External links
 

Nickelodeon Kids' Choice Awards
Kids' Choice Awards
Kids' Choice Awards
1998 in Los Angeles
Kids